Theodore Paul "Ted" Popson (born September 10, 1966) is a former professional American football tight end in the World League of American Football and the National Football League. In 1992, Popson played for the WLAF's  London Monarchs. He then played for the NFL's San Francisco 49ers (1994–1996) and Kansas City Chiefs (1997–1998).

He co-hosts sports talk radio program called Steak & Popson, with Steve Salisbury, at KAHI AM 950, in Sacramento, CA and has worked for 95.7FM in San Francisco, CA.

References

1966 births
Living people
People from Granada Hills, Los Angeles
Players of American football from Los Angeles
American football tight ends
Portland State Vikings football players
London Monarchs players
San Francisco 49ers players
Kansas City Chiefs players